, there are 151 elementary/K-8 schools, 16 middle schools, and 57 high schools in the School District of Philadelphia, excluding Charter Schools.

Elementary/K-8 schools

 Adaire, Alexander School
 Allen, Dr. Ethel School
 Allen, Ethan School
 Anderson, Add B. School
 Arthur, Chester A. School
 Bache-Martin Elementary School
 Barton School
 Benjamin Franklin Academics Plus School
 Bethune, Mary Mcleod School
 Blaine, James G. School
 Blankenburg, R. School
 Bregy, F. Amedee School
 Bridesburg School
 Brown, Henry A. School
 Brown, Joseph H. School
 Bryant, William C. School
 Carnell, Laura H. School
 Catharine, Joseph W. School
 Cayuga School
 Fox Chase School
 Childs, George W. School
 Comegys, Benjamin B.
 Comly, Watson School
 Cooke, Jay School
 Cook-Wissahickon School
 Coppin, Fanny Jackson School
 Cramp, William School
 Crossroads Academy @ Hunting Park
 Day, Anna B. School
 DeBurgos, J. School
 Decatur, Stephen School
 Dick, William School
 Disston, Hamilton School
 Dobson, James School
 Duckrey, Tanner School
 Dunbar, Paul L. School
 Edmonds, Franklin S. School
 Edwin Fitler Academics Plus School
 Elkin, Lewis School
 Ellwood School
 Emlen, Eleanor C. School
 Farrell, Louis H. School
 Fell, D. Newlin School
 Feltonville Intermediate School
 Fitzpatrick, A. L. School
 Forrest, Edwin School
 Frank, Anne School
 Gideon, Edward School
 Girard, Stephen School
 Gompers, Samuel School
 Greenberg, Joseph School
 Greenfield, Albert M. School
 Hackett, Horatio B. School
 Hall, Prince School
 Hamilton, Andrew School
 Harrington, Avery D. School
 Hartranft, John F. School
 Henry, Charles W. School
 Heston, Edward School
 Holme, Thomas School
 Hopkinson, Francis School
 Houston, Henry H. School
 Howe, Julia Ward School
 Hunter, William H. School
 Jenks Academy for the Arts & Sciences
 Jenks, Abram School
 John Hancock Demonstration School
 Juniata Park Academy
 Kearny, Gen. Philip School
 Kelley, William D. School
 Kelly, John B. School
 Kenderton School
 Kennedy Crossan Academics Plus School
 Key, Francis S. School
 Kirkbride, Eliza B.
 Lamberton, Robert E. School
 Lawton, Henry W. School
 Lea, Henry C. School
 Lewis C. Cassidy Academics Plus School
 Lingelbach, Anna L. School
 Locke, Alain School
 Loesche, William H. School
 Logan, James School
 Longstreth, William C. School
 Lowell, James R. School
 Ludlow, James R. School
 Marshall, John School
 Marshall, Thurgood School
 Mayfair School
 McCall, Gen. George A. School
 McCloskey, John F. School
 McClure, Alexander K. School
 McDaniel, Delaplaine School
 McKinley, William School
 McMichael, Morton School
 Meade, Gen. George G. School
 Meredith, William M. School
 Mifflin, Thomas School
 Mitchell, S. Weir School
 Moffet, John School
 Moore, J. Hampton School
 Morris, Robert School
 Morrison, Andrew J. School
 Morton, Thomas G. School
 Munoz-Marin, Hon. Luis School
 Nebinger, George W. School
 Northeast Propel Academy
 Olney Elementary School
 Overbrook Elementary School
 Overbrook Educational School
 Patterson, John M. School
 Peirce, Thomas M. School
 Penn Alexander School
 Pennell, Joseph School
 Pennypacker, Samuel School
 Penrose School
 Pollock, Robert B. School
 Potter-Thomas School
 Powel, Samuel School
 Rhawnhurst School
 Rhoads, James School
 Rhodes School
 Richmond Elementary School
 Roosevelt Elementary School
 Rowen, William School
 Sharswood, George W. School
 Shawmont School
 Sheppard, Isaac A. School
 Sheridan, Philip H. School
 Solis-Cohen, Solomon School
 Southwark School
 Spring Garden School
 Spruance, Gilbert School
 Stanton, Edwin M. School
 Stearne, Allen M. School
 Steel, Edward School
 Sullivan, James J. School
 Taggart, John H. School
 Taylor, Bayard School
 Thomas K. Finletter Academics Plus School
 Vare-Washington School
 Waring, Laura W. School
 Washington, Martha School
 Webster, John H. School
 Welsh, John School
 Widener Memorial School
 Willard, Frances E. School
 Wright, Richard R. School
 Ziegler, William H. School

Two special admission schools:

 Girard Academic Music Program
 Julia R. Masterman Laboratory and Demonstration School

Middle schools

 AMY 5 @ James Martin
 AMY Northwest 
 Baldi Middle School
 Clemente, Roberto Middle School
 Conwell, Russell Magnet Middle School
 Crossroads Accelerated Academy
 Feltonville Arts & Sciences School
 Harding, Warren G. Middle School
 Hill-Freedman World Academy
 Meehan, Austin Middle School
 Middle Years Alt – MYA
 Tilden, William T. Middle School
 Wagner, Gen. Louis Middle School
 Washington, Grover Jr. Middle School
 Wilson, Woodrow Middle School

High schools

Neighborhood

 John Bartram High School
 Thomas A. Edison High School
 Samuel Fels High School
 Frankford High School
 Benjamin Franklin High School
 Horace Furness High School
 Kensington High School
 Martin Luther King High School
 Abraham Lincoln High School
 Northeast High School
 Overbrook High School
 Penn Treaty School (6-12)
 Roxborough High School
 William L. Sayre High School
 South Philadelphia High School
 Strawberry Mansion High School
 George Washington High School
 West Philadelphia High School

Special admission

 Academy at Palumbo
 The Arts Academy at Benjamin Rush
 Bodine International Affairs
 CAPA
 Carver High School for Engineering and Science
 Central High School
 GAMP
 Franklin Learning Center
 Hill-Freedman World Academy High School
 Julia R. Masterman School
 Kensington Creative & Performing Arts High School
 Kensington Health Sciences Academy High School
 Parkway Center City High School
 Parkway Northwest High School
 Parkway West High School
 Philadelphia High School for Girls
 Philadelphia Learning Academy
 Philadelphia Military Academy
 Philadelphia Virtual Academy
 Science Leadership Academy
 Science Leadership Academy at Beeber (6-12)
 The LINC
 Walter Biddle Saul High School for Agricultural Sciences

Citywide admission

 Building 21
Constitution High School
 Murrell Dobbins Vocational School
 High School of the Future
 Lankenau High School
 Jules E. Mastbaum Technical High School
 Motivation High School
 Paul Robeson High School for Human Services
 Randolph Technical High School
 The U School
 The Workshop School
 Swenson Arts and Technology High School
 Vaux Big Picture High School

Former schools/Historic School Buildings
Elementary Schools

 Adelphi School, closed 1906
 Alexander Wilson School, closed 2013
 Anna B. Pratt Elementary School, closed 2013
 Anthony Wayne School
 Bridesburg School, closed 1894
 Charles R. Drew, closed 2013
 Charles Schaeffer School
 Daniel Boone School (now houses Achieve Academy of Philadelphia)
 David Farragut School
 David Landreth School
 Fairhill Elementary School, closed 2013
 Francis Read School, closed 1980
 Gen. David B. Birney School (currently Lindley Academy Charter School at Birney)
 Gen. John F. Reynolds School, closed 2013
 George L. Brooks School
 George Chandler School
 George L. Horn School
 Washington, George School
 Germantown Grammar School
 Guion S. Bluford School (currently Universal Bluford Charter School)
 Henry Longfellow School
 J. Sylvester Ramsey School
 Joseph C. Ferguson Elementary School, closed 2013
 James Alcorn School (currently Universal Alcorn Charter School)
 Joseph Leidy Elementary School, closed 2013
 John Greenleaf Whittier School  
 John L. Kinsey School, closed 2013 (now housing Building 21)
 Laura H. Carnell School
 Leslie P. Hill Elementary School, closed 2013
 Lydia Darrah School
 Mary Channing Wister School
 Mary Disston School
 Mechanicsville School
 M.H. Stanton Elementary School, closed 2013
 Mifflin School
 Muhlenberg School
 Nathaniel Hawthorne School
 Northeast Manual Training School
 Richardson L. Wright School
 Robert Fulton School, closed 2013
 Robert Ralston School
 Rudolph Walton School, closed 2003
 Samuel Daroff School (currently Universal Daroff Charter School)
 Simon Muhr Work Training School
 Spring Garden School No. 1
 Thaddeus Stevens School of Observation
 Thomas Buchanan Read School
 Thomas Creighton School (currently Universal Creighton Charter School)
 Thomas Dunlap School
 Thomas Durham School (now housing Independence Charter School)
 Thomas Meehan School
 Thomas Powers School
 Walter George Smith School, closed 2013
 William B. Hanna School
 William H. Harrison School (now housing St. Malachy School)
 William Levering School (now housing AMY Northwest MS)
 William W. Axe School (now housing Northeast Frankford Boys & Girls Club of Philadelphia)

Middle Schools

 Ada H.H. Lewis Middle School, closed 2008
 Anna H. Shaw Middle School, closed 2013 (currently Hardy Williams Academy)
 Charles Y. Audenried Junior High School (currently Universal Audenried Charter High School)
 Elizabeth Duane Gillespie Junior High School, closed 2011
 George Wharton Pepper Middle School, closed 2013
 Holmes Junior High School
 John P. Turner Middle School
 Mayer Sulzberger Middle School, closed 2010
 Norris S. Barratt Middle School, closed 2012
 Sheridan West Middle School, closed 2013

High schools

 Charles Carroll High School, closed 2013
 Communications Technology High School, closed 2013
 Edward W. Bok Technical High School, closed 2013
 Germantown High School, closed 2013
 Robert E. Lamberton High School, closed 2013
 Stephen A. Douglas High School, closed 2013
 Thomas FitzSimons High School, closed 2013
 William Penn High School, closed 2014
 University City High School, closed 2013

See also

Francis M. Drexel School, former school
Edison Schools
Hope Charter School
Mathematics, Civics and Sciences Charter School

External links

 The School District of Philadelphia
 Office of Student Enrollment & Placement
 The Office of Secondary Education Planning Guide: A Guide for September 2007 High School Admissions

References

 List of schools
Schools
Philadelphia